Yolande Christina Charles  is a British musician and teacher. She has played bass guitar with Paul Weller, David A. Stewart, Robbie Williams, Mick Jagger, The Waterboys, Hans Zimmer and from July 2017 through early 2020 she was a member of Squeeze. She also plays with her own band, The Deep Mo.

Charles has been playing professionally since 1989. In 1993, she was part of the house band on the short-lived TV show Saturday Zoo. She released an EP in 2009 and an album in 2011 with the Deep Mo, and continues to perform both with the band and on solo acoustic shows. She has also been involved in teaching, including running classes at the Royal Northern College of Music, Manchester.

Charles was appointed Member of the Order of the British Empire (MBE) in the 2020 Birthday Honours for services to music.

References

External links

British bass guitarists
Women bass guitarists
Living people
Year of birth missing (living people)
Black British rock musicians
Members of the Order of the British Empire